Stevie Shears (born 1954/1955) is an English musician known for playing in the rock bands Tiger Lily and Ultravox! (later Ultravox), as well as being part of the bands Faith Global and Cowboys International.

Biography

Tiger Lily and Ultravox!
Working in a paint factory and playing in different bands in Dagenham, Essex, he made contact with John Foxx and formed Tiger Lily in 1973 (together with bassist Chris Cross). Later, Tiger Lily changed its name to Ultravox! (later known simply as Ultravox). Between February and March 1978, after releasing with this band the Ultravox! (early 1977) and Ha! Ha! Ha! (1977) albums Shears was replaced by Robin Simon.

Post-Ultravox! bands
After Ultravox!, Shears formed a band with his friend Ice, real name Roland Oxland, bassist of Gloria Mundi. Gloria Mundi and Ultravox! were friends from the UK live music scene. Gloria Mundi featured Eddie Maelov and Sunshine Patterson who, as Eddie & Sunshine, would support Ultravox on their 1981 Rage in Eden tour. Gloria Mundi's saxophonist CC also played on 'Hiroshima Mon Amour' from Ultravox's second album Ha! Ha! Ha! (1977). Later Shears and Jason Guy formed a duo called New Men. This was short-lived, as Shears left to join Cowboys International, in early 1980, replacing Adam Ant's guitarist Marco Pirroni. In 1981 and with Cowboys International dissolved, he collaborated with the band's singer, Ken Lockie, on his solo album, The Impossible.

Shears never having lost contact with Guy, collaborated under the name of Faith Global, and released an EP called Earth Report (1982) and an album called The Same Mistakes (1983) both on Survival Records. Faith Global was short-lived, and these two records remain their only recordings.

As of 2000, he was still playing guitar.

Equipment
When Ultravox! was Tiger Lily, he used a Gibson SG guitar.

Also while with Ultravox, he played a white Fender Telecaster and a Fender Stratocaster.

Discography
With Tiger Lily:
 "Ain't Misbehavin'" single (Gull, 1975)

With Ultravox!:
 Ultravox! album (Island, 1977)
 Ha!-Ha-!Ha! album (Island, 1977)
 Retro EP (Island, 1978)

With Cowboys International:
 Revisited compilation (Pnuma, 2003)

With Ken Lockie:
 The Impossible album (Virgin, 1981)
 Dance House single

With Faith Global:
 Earth Report EP (Survival, 1982)
 The Same Mistakes album (Survival, 1983)

References

External links
Ultravox official web
Cowboys International official web

1950s births
British rock guitarists
British male guitarists
English new wave musicians
People from Dagenham
Living people
Ultravox members
British multi-instrumentalists